The SKY Perfect JSAT Group is a Japanese corporate group that claims to be Asia's largest satellite communication and multi-channel pay TV company. It owns the SKY PerfecTV! satellite broadcasting service and the SKY Perfect Well Think content studio, among other businesses.

History

JSAT

The space and satellite business of the group dates to 1985, when its three predecessor companies were formed: Japan Communications Satellite Company (JCSC), Space Communications Corporation (SCC) and Satellite Japan Corporation (SJC). JCSAT-1, Japan's first private-sector communications satellite, was launched in 1989. JCSC and SJC merged in 1993, becoming Japan Satellite Systems, which changed its name to JSAT Corporation in 2000. JSAT was listed on the Tokyo Stock Exchange in the same year. SCC was acquired by the Sky Perfect JSAT Group in 2008.

Sky PerfecTV
The pay TV business of the group dates to 1994, when Japan Digital Broadcast Service was founded (under the temporary name "DMC Planning"). It began the PerfecTV! pay TV service in 1996. Japan Sky Broadcasting ("JSkyB") was founded in 1996 and merged with JDBS in 1998. In 2000 it acquired the Japan business of DirecTV.

Merger
JSAT and SKY Perfect transferred their stock to a joint holding company, SKY Perfect JSAT Corporation, on April 2, 2007. SKY Perfect JSAT Corporation changed its name to SKY Perfect JSAT Holdings Inc. on June 27, 2008. The SKY Perfect JSAT Corporation name was re-adopted by JSAT Corporation, SKY Perfect Communications and Space Communications Corporation when they merged on October 1, 2008.

Satellite fleet

The JSAT constellation is a communication and broadcasting satellite constellation currently operated by SKY Perfect JSAT Group. It has become the most important commercial constellation in Japan, and the fifth of the world. It has practically amalgamated all private satellite operators in Japan, with only B-SAT left as a local competitor.

It began in 1985 with the opening of the communication markets in Japan and the founding of Japan Communications Satellite Company, Satellite Japan Corporation, Space Communications Corporation. It grew by own investment, mergers and acquisitions of the parent companies. As of August 2016, it includes the fleets of three previously mentioned companies, Horizons Satellite and NTT DoCoMo and the DSN military network.

References

External links 
 SKY Perfect JSAT Holdings 
 SKY Perfect JSAT Corporation 

Broadcasting in Japan
Satellite operators
Mass media companies based in Tokyo
Holding companies based in Tokyo
Holding companies established in 2007
Mass media companies established in 2007
Japanese companies established in 2007
Aerospace companies of Japan